The 1980–81 NBA season was the Kings 32nd season in the NBA and their ninth season in the city of Kansas City. The Kansas City Kings made the playoffs with a 40-42 win loss record and appeared in the western conference finals where they lost to the also 40-42 Houston Rockets. This is the only time two NBA teams with losing records have made it to the conference finals.

Draft picks

Roster

Regular season

Season standings

Notes
 z, y – division champions
 x – clinched playoff spot

Record vs. opponents

Game log

Regular season

|- align="center" bgcolor="#ccffcc"
| 1
| October 11, 1980
| Utah
| W 98–91
|
|
|
| Kemper Arena
| 1–0
|- align="center" bgcolor="#ffcccc"
| 2
| October 12, 1980
| @ Phoenix
| L 100–109
|
|
|
| Arizona Veterans Memorial Coliseum
| 1–1
|- align="center" bgcolor="#ffcccc"
| 3
| October 14, 1980
| @ San Antonio
| L 103–109
|
|
|
| HemisFair Arena
| 1–2
|- align="center" bgcolor="#ffcccc"
| 4
| October 15, 1980
| Los Angeles
| L 107–112 (OT)
|
|
|
| Kemper Arena
| 1–3
|- align="center" bgcolor="#ccffcc"
| 5
| October 17, 1980
| @ Dallas
| W 103–91
|
|
|
| Reunion Arena
| 2–3
|- align="center" bgcolor="#ffcccc"
| 6
| October 18, 1980
| Seattle
| L 122–127
|
|
|
| Kemper Arena
| 2–4
|- align="center" bgcolor="#ffcccc"
| 7
| October 21, 1980
| Golden State
| L 111–116
|
|
|
| Kemper Arena
| 2–5
|- align="center" bgcolor="#ccffcc"
| 8
| October 23, 1980
| @ Houston
| W 105–96
|
|
|
| The Summit
| 3–5
|- align="center" bgcolor="#ccffcc"
| 9
| October 25, 1980
| Denver
| W 125–122
|
|
|
| Kemper Arena
| 4–5
|- align="center" bgcolor="#ffcccc"
| 10
| October 28, 1980
| @ Atlanta
| L 109–119
|
|
|
| The Omni
| 4–6
|- align="center" bgcolor="#ccffcc"
| 11
| October 29, 1980
| Portland
| W 115–98
|
|
|
| Kemper Arena
| 5–6
|- align="center" bgcolor="#ffcccc"
| 12
| October 31, 1980
| @ Boston
| L 110–115
|
|
|
| Boston Garden
| 5–7

|- align="center" bgcolor="#ffcccc"
| 13
| November 1, 1980
| Phoenix
| L 100–127
|
|
|
| Kemper Arena
| 5–8
|- align="center" bgcolor="#ffcccc"
| 14
| November 4, 1980
| @ Utah
| L 104–107
|
|
|
| Salt Palace Acord Arena
| 5–9
|- align="center" bgcolor="#ccffcc"
| 15
| November 5, 1980
| New York
| W 111–102
|
|
|
| Kemper Arena
| 6–9
|- align="center" bgcolor="#ffcccc"
| 16
| November 7, 1980
| @ Philadelphia
| L 100–117
|
|
|
| The Spectrum
| 6–10
|- align="center" bgcolor="#ccffcc"
| 17
| November 8, 1980
| Cleveland
| W 111–106
|
|
|
| Kemper Arena
| 7–10
|- align="center" bgcolor="#ccffcc"
| 18
| November 11, 1980
| @ Portland
| W 102–101
|
|
|
| Memorial Coliseum
| 8–10
|- align="center" bgcolor="#ffcccc"
| 19
| November 12, 1980
| @ Golden State
| L 101–111
|
|
|
| Oakland–Alameda County Coliseum Arena
| 8–11
|- align="center" bgcolor="#ffcccc"
| 20
| November 14, 1980
| @ Seattle
| L 125–127
|
|
|
| Kingdome
| 8–12
|- align="center" bgcolor="#ccffcc"
| 21
| November 15, 1980
| @ San Diego
| W 96–94
|
|
|
| San Diego Sports Arena
| 9–12
|- align="center" bgcolor="#ffcccc"
| 22
| November 18, 1980
| @ Los Angeles
| L 94–107
|
|
|
| The Forum
| 9–13
|- align="center" bgcolor="#ffcccc"
| 23
| November 21, 1980
| @ Denver
| L 121–134
|
|
|
| McNichols Sports Arena
| 9–14
|- align="center" bgcolor="#ccffcc"
| 24
| November 26, 1980
| New Jersey
| W 118–100
|
|
|
| Kemper Arena
| 10–14
|- align="center" bgcolor="#ffcccc"
| 25
| November 28, 1980
| @ Detroit
| L 94–104
|
|
|
| Pontiac Silverdome
| 10–15
|- align="center" bgcolor="#ffcccc"
| 26
| November 29, 1980
| San Antonio
| L 104–106
|
|
|
| Kemper Arena
| 10–16

|- align="center" bgcolor="#ffcccc"
| 27
| December 2, 1980
| @ Washington
| L 103–107
|
|
|
| Capital Centre
| 10–17
|- align="center" bgcolor="#ccffcc"
| 28
| December 3, 1980
| Phoenix
| W 103–100
|
|
|
| Kemper Arena
| 11–17
|- align="center" bgcolor="#ccffcc"
| 29
| December 5, 1980
| Houston
| W 108–100
|
|
|
| Kemper Arena
| 12–17
|- align="center" bgcolor="#ffcccc"
| 30
| December 6, 1980
| @ Indiana
| L 88–107
|
|
|
| Market Square Arena
| 12–18
|- align="center" bgcolor="#ccffcc"
| 31
| December 10, 1980
| San Diego
| W 112–100
|
|
|
| Kemper Arena
| 13–18
|- align="center" bgcolor="#ffcccc"
| 32
| December 11, 1980
| @ San Antonio
| L 104–122
|
|
|
| HemisFair Arena
| 13–19
|- align="center" bgcolor="#ccffcc"
| 33
| December 13, 1980
| Dallas
| W 114–107
|
|
|
| Kemper Arena
| 14–19
|- align="center" bgcolor="#ccffcc"
| 34
| December 16, 1980
| @ Denver
| W 133–118
|
|
|
| McNichols Sports Arena
| 15–19
|- align="center" bgcolor="#ffcccc"
| 35
| December 17, 1980
| @ Seattle
| L 94–101
|
|
|
| Kingdome
| 15–20
|- align="center" bgcolor="#ffcccc"
| 36
| December 20, 1980
| Indiana
| L 103–107
|
|
|
| Kemper Arena
| 15–21
|- align="center" bgcolor="#ccffcc"
| 37
| December 23, 1980
| @ Cleveland
| W 102–100
|
|
|
| Richfield Coliseum
| 16–21
|- align="center" bgcolor="#ffcccc"
| 38
| December 26, 1980
| Philadelphia
| L 103–113
|
|
|
| Kemper Arena
| 16–22
|- align="center" bgcolor="#ffcccc"
| 39
| December 27, 1980
| @ New York
| L 99–100
|
|
|
| Madison Square Garden
| 16–23
|- align="center" bgcolor="#ccffcc"
| 40
| December 28, 1980
| @ New Jersey
| W 102–99
|
|
|
| Rutgers Athletic Center
| 17–23
|- align="center" bgcolor="#ffcccc"
| 41
| December 30, 1980
| Golden State
| L 104–106
|
|
|
| Kemper Arena
| 17–24

|- align="center" bgcolor="#ccffcc"
| 42
| January 2, 1981
| Utah
| W 101–95
|
|
|
| Kemper Arena
| 18–24
|- align="center" bgcolor="#ccffcc"
| 43
| January 7, 1981
| @ Houston
| W 114–108
|
|
|
| The Summit
| 19–24
|- align="center" bgcolor="#ccffcc"
| 44
| January 8, 1981
| Washington
| W 136–118
|
|
|
| Kemper Arena
| 20–24
|- align="center" bgcolor="#ccffcc"
| 45
| January 10, 1981
| @ Utah
| W 99–92
|
|
|
| Salt Palace Acord Arena
| 21–24
|- align="center" bgcolor="#ffcccc"
| 46
| January 11, 1981
| San Diego
| L 105–115
|
|
|
| Kemper Arena
| 21–25
|- align="center" bgcolor="#ffcccc"
| 47
| January 14, 1981
| Portland
| L 91–110
|
|
|
| Kemper Arena
| 21–26
|- align="center" bgcolor="#ffcccc"
| 48
| January 16, 1981
| @ Milwaukee
| L 112–118 (OT)
|
|
|
| MECCA Arena
| 21–27
|- align="center" bgcolor="#ffcccc"
| 49
| January 17, 1981
| Denver
| L 122–123
|
|
|
| Kemper Arena
| 21–28
|- align="center" bgcolor="#ccffcc"
| 50
| January 20, 1981
| @ Dallas
| W 104–91
|
|
|
| Reunion Arena
| 22–28
|- align="center" bgcolor="#ccffcc"
| 51
| January 21, 1981
| San Antonio
| W 115–108
|
|
|
| Kemper Arena
| 23–28
|- align="center" bgcolor="#ccffcc"
| 52
| January 23, 1981
| Houston
| W 113–107
|
|
|
| Kemper Arena
| 24–28
|- align="center" bgcolor="#ffcccc"
| 53
| January 27, 1981
| @ San Diego
| L 114–119
|
|
|
| San Diego Sports Arena
| 24–29
|- align="center" bgcolor="#ffcccc"
| 54
| January 29, 1981
| @ Los Angeles
| L 104–118
|
|
|
| The Forum
| 24–30

|- align="center"
|colspan="9" bgcolor="#bbcaff"|All-Star Break
|- style="background:#cfc;"
|- bgcolor="#bbffbb"
|- align="center" bgcolor="#ccffcc"
| 55
| February 3, 1981
| @ Dallas
| W 121–100
|
|
|
| Reunion Arena
| 25–30
|- align="center" bgcolor="#ccffcc"
| 56
| February 4, 1981
| Detroit
| W 91–90
|
|
|
| Kemper Arena
| 26–30
|- align="center" bgcolor="#ccffcc"
| 57
| February 6, 1981
| @ Seattle
| W 102–92
|
|
|
| Kingdome
| 27–30
|- align="center" bgcolor="#ffcccc"
| 58
| February 8, 1981
| @ Portland
| L 123–129 (OT)
|
|
|
| Memorial Coliseum
| 27–31
|- align="center" bgcolor="#ffcccc"
| 59
| February 10, 1981
| @ Chicago
| L 115–116
|
|
|
| Chicago Stadium
| 27–32
|- align="center" bgcolor="#ccffcc"
| 60
| February 11, 1981
| Utah
| W 99–87
|
|
|
| Kemper Arena
| 28–32
|- align="center" bgcolor="#ccffcc"
| 61
| February 13, 1981
| Atlanta
| W 113–106
|
|
|
| Kemper Arena
| 29–32
|- align="center" bgcolor="#ccffcc"
| 62
| February 15, 1981
| Seattle
| W 107–105
|
|
|
| Kemper Arena
| 30–32
|- align="center" bgcolor="#ccffcc"
| 63
| February 18, 1981
| Boston
| W 114–113
|
|
|
| Kemper Arena
| 31–32
|- align="center" bgcolor="#ccffcc"
| 64
| February 20, 1981
| Milwaukee
| W 112–109
|
|
|
| Kemper Arena
| 32–32
|- align="center" bgcolor="#ffcccc"
| 65
| February 21, 1981
| @ Denver
| L 109–129
|
|
|
| McNichols Sports Arena
| 32–33
|- align="center" bgcolor="#ffcccc"
| 66
| February 22, 1981
| @ Golden State
| L 96–104
|
|
|
| Oakland–Alameda County Coliseum Arena
| 33–33
|- align="center" bgcolor="#ccffcc"
| 67
| February 26, 1981
| Dallas
| W 105–102
|
|
|
| Kemper Arena
| 33–34
|- align="center" bgcolor="#ffcccc"
| 68
| February 28, 1981
| Golden State
| L 101–110
|
|
|
| Kemper Arena
| 33–35

|- align="center" bgcolor="#ffcccc"
| 69
| March 3, 1981
| Los Angeles
| L 98–99
|
|
|
| Kemper Arena
| 33–36
|- align="center" bgcolor="#ccffcc"
| 70
| March 4, 1981
| @ San Antonio
| W 111–97
|
|
|
| HemisFair Arena
| 34–36
|- align="center" bgcolor="#ccffcc"
| 71
| March 5, 1981
| Portland
| W 106–100
|
|
|
| Kemper Arena
| 35–36
|- align="center" bgcolor="#ccffcc"
| 72
| March 8, 1981
| Phoenix
| W 105–68
|
|
|
| Kemper Arena
| 36–36
|- align="center" bgcolor="#ccffcc"
| 73
| March 10, 1981
| @ San Diego
| W 107–100
|
|
|
| San Diego Sports Arena
| 37–36
|- align="center" bgcolor="#ffcccc"
| 74
| March 13, 1981
| @ Los Angeles
| L 101–116
|
|
|
| The Forum
| 37–37
|- align="center" bgcolor="#ffcccc"
| 75
| March 15, 1981
| Chicago
| L 87–97
|
|
|
| Kemper Arena
| 37–38
|- align="center" bgcolor="#ffcccc"
| 76
| March 18, 1981
| Denver
| L 124–126 (2OT)
|
|
|
| Kemper Arena
| 37–39
|- align="center" bgcolor="#ffcccc"
| 77
| March 20, 1981
| San Antonio
| L 111–114 (OT)
|
|
|
| Kemper Arena
| 37–40
|- align="center" bgcolor="#ffcccc"
| 78
| March 22, 1981
| Houston
| L 108–114
|
|
|
| Kemper Arena
| 37–41
|- align="center" bgcolor="#ccffcc"
| 79
| March 24, 1981
| @ Utah
| W 105–92
|
|
|
| Salt Palace Acord Arena
| 38–41
|- align="center" bgcolor="#ccffcc"
| 80
| March 25, 1981
| @ Phoenix
| W 110–101
|
|
|
| Arizona Veterans Memorial Coliseum
| 39–41
|- align="center" bgcolor="#ffcccc"
| 81
| March 27, 1981
| @ Houston
| L 84–91
|
|
|
| The Summit
| 39–42
|- align="center" bgcolor="#ccffcc"
| 82
| March 29, 1981
| Dallas
| W 113–104
|
|
|
| Kemper Arena
| 40–42

Playoffs

|- align="center" bgcolor="#ccffcc"
| 1
| April 1, 1981
| @ Portland
| W 98–97 (OT)
| Birdsong (29)
| King,Lacey (12)
| Lacey (10)
| Memorial Coliseum12,666
| 1–0
|- align="center" bgcolor="#ffcccc"
| 2
| April 3, 1981
| Portland
| L 119–124 (OT)
| Wedman (31)
| Lacey (9)
| Lacey (8)
| Kemper Arena11,088
| 1–1
|- align="center" bgcolor="#ccffcc"
| 3
| April 5, 1981
| @ Portland
| W 104–95
| King (28)
| King (15)
| Grunfeld (6)
| Memorial Coliseum12,666
| 2–1
|-

|- align="center" bgcolor="#ffcccc"
| 1
| April 7, 1981
| @ Phoenix
| L 80–102
| King (15)
| King (8)
| Walton (6)
| Arizona Veterans Memorial Coliseum12,660
| 0–1
|- align="center" bgcolor="#ccffcc"
| 2
| April 8, 1981
| @ Phoenix
| W 88–83
| Wedman (24)
| King (12)
| Grunfeld (8)
| Arizona Veterans Memorial Coliseum12,660
| 1–1
|- align="center" bgcolor="#ccffcc"
| 3
| April 10, 1981
| Phoenix
| W 93–92
| King (29)
| Lacey (12)
| Grunfeld (7)
| Kemper Arena13,776
| 2–1
|- align="center" bgcolor="#ccffcc"
| 4
| April 12, 1981
| Phoenix
| W 102–95
| Grunfeld (27)
| Lacey (11)
| Lacey (10)
| Kemper Arena11,089
| 3–1
|- align="center" bgcolor="#ffcccc"
| 5
| April 15, 1981
| @ Phoenix
| L 89–101
| King (29)
| Douglas,Lacey (8)
| Grunfeld (8)
| Arizona Veterans Memorial Coliseum12,660
| 3–2
|- align="center" bgcolor="#ffcccc"
| 6
| April 17, 1981
| Phoenix
| L 76–81
| Wedman (19)
| Lacey (12)
| Grunfeld (8)
| Kemper Arena15,232
| 3–3
|- align="center" bgcolor="#ccffcc"
| 7
| April 19, 1981
| @ Phoenix
| W 95–88
| Grunfeld,King (23)
| King,Lacey (7)
| Wedman (9)
| Arizona Veterans Memorial Coliseum12,660
| 4–3
|-

|- align="center" bgcolor="#ffcccc"
| 1
| April 21, 1981
| Houston
| L 78–97
| Grunfeld (20)
| King (12)
| Ford,Lacey (7)
| Kemper Arena13,885
| 0–1
|- align="center" bgcolor="#ccffcc"
| 2
| April 22, 1981
| Houston
| W 88–79
| King (31)
| King (10)
| King,Lacey (6)
| Kemper Arena14,326
| 1–1
|- align="center" bgcolor="#ffcccc"
| 3
| April 24, 1981
| @ Houston
| L 88–92
| King,Wedman (22)
| King (8)
| Wedman (7)
| The Summit16,121
| 1–2
|- align="center" bgcolor="#ffcccc"
| 4
| April 26, 1981
| @ Houston
| L 89–100
| King (24)
| King,Lacey (8)
| Ford (10)
| The Summit16,121
| 1–3
|- align="center" bgcolor="#ffcccc"
| 5
| April 29, 1981
| Houston
| L 88–97
| Wedman (20)
| King (16)
| Lacey (7)
| Kemper Arena14,640
| 1–4
|-

Player statistics

Season

Playoffs

Awards and records
 Otis Birdsong, All-NBA Second Team

Transactions

References

Sacramento Kings seasons
Ka
1980 in sports in Kansas
1981 in sports in Kansas